This is a list of regions occupied or annexed by the Empire of Japan until 1945, the year of the end of World War II in Asia, after the surrender of Japan. Control over all territories except most of the Japanese mainland (Hokkaido, Honshu, Kyushu, Shikoku, and some 6,000 small surrounding islands) was renounced by Japan in the unconditional surrender after World War II and the Treaty of San Francisco. A number of territories occupied by the United States after 1945 were returned to Japan, but there are still a number of disputed territories between Japan and Russia (the Kuril Islands dispute), South Korea and North Korea (the Liancourt Rocks dispute), the People's Republic of China and Taiwan (the Senkaku Islands dispute).

Pre-1945

Colonies 
Hokkaido — 1869–1918
Chishima Islands – 1875–1918
Ryukyu Islands – 1879–1918
Nanpō Islands – 1891–1918
Taiwan and the Penghu Islands – 1895–1945
Minamitorishima – 1898–1918
Karafuto – 1905–1943
Kantō – 1905–1945
Chōsen – 1910–1945
Kiautschou Bay Leased Territory – 1914–1922
Nan’yō 1919–1945

Occupied territories 
 All ports and major towns in the Primorsky Krai and Siberia regions of Russia east of the city of Chita, from 1918 until gradually withdrawing in 1922.
 North Sakhalin was occupied by Japan 1920-1925.

World War II

Disclaimer: Not all areas were considered part of Imperial Japan but rather part of puppet states & sphere of influence, allies, included separately for demographic purposes.  Sources: POPULSTAT Asia Oceania

Other occupied World War 2 islands:
 Andaman Islands (India) – March 29, 1942 – September 9, 1945
Christmas Island (Australia) – March 1942 – October 1945

Areas attacked but not conquered
 Kohima and Manipur (India)
 Dornod (Khalkhin Gol, Mongolia)
 Midway Atoll  (United States)

Raided without immediate intent of occupation
 Air raids
 Pearl Harbor (Hawaii, United States)
 Colombo and Trincomalee (Sri Lanka)
 Calcutta (India)
 Air raids on Australia, including: 
 Broome (Western Australia, Australia)
 Darwin (Northern Territory, Australia)
 Townsville (Queensland, Australia)
 Dutch Harbor (Alaska, United States)
 Lookout Air Raids (Oregon, United States)
 Naval bombardment by submarine
 British Columbia (Canada)
 Ellwood (Santa Barbara, California, United States)
 Fort Stevens (Oregon, United States)
 Newcastle (New South Wales, Australia)
 Gregory (Western Australia, Australia)
 Midget sub attack 
 Sydney (New South Wales, Australia) 
 Diego Suarez (Madagascar)

See also 
 Japanese colonial empire
 Greater East Asia Co-Prosperity Sphere
 Tanaka Memorial
 Jewish settlement in the Japanese Empire
List of wars involving Japan
 Sangokujin – 'third country person'

References

Territories occupied by Imperial Japan
Ter
Japan in World War II
New Imperialism
Territories occupied